"Te Amo Corazón" is a song by Prince, released as the first single from his 2006 album, 3121. It was officially released by the NPG Music Club on December 13, 2005. It failed to chart in the US; however, it was a top 25 hit in multiple European countries, charting as high as number two in Spain and number seven in Italy.

The title roughly translates to "I love you, sweetheart" in Spanish, the song is a slow, simmering number influenced by the Brazilian Bossa Nova. The music video was shot in Marrakesh, stars Mía Maestro and was directed by actress Salma Hayek.

The song was covered by Viktoria Tolstoy on her album Pictures of Me, along with another Prince song, "Strollin'".

Charts

References

External links
 "Te Amo Corazón" video (via VH1)

2000s ballads
Prince (musician) songs
2005 singles
Songs written by Prince (musician)
NPG Records singles
Song recordings produced by Prince (musician)
Pop ballads
2005 songs